Horatio Walpole (11 July 1663 – 1717), of Beck Hall, Norfolk, was an English Tory politician who sat in the English and British House of Commons between 1702 and 1710. He was the uncle of Sir Robert Walpole, Prime Minister, but differed politically from the rest of the family.

Early life
Walpole was the fourth, but second surviving son of Sir Edward Walpole of Houghton, Norfolk and his wife Susan Crane, daughter of Sir Robert Crane, 1st Baronet, of Chilton, Suffolk. He was the brother of Colonel Robert Walpole and hence the uncle of Sir Robert Walpole the Whig leader. He joined the army and was a cornet in an independent troop of horse and then in the 2nd Dragoon Guards in 1685. He was a captain from 1689 to 1691. He resigned from the army to marry Lady Anne Coke, widow of Robert Coke  of Holkham, Norfolk, and  daughter of Thomas Osborne, 1st Duke of Leeds on 26 March 1691. His stepson Edward Coke, the heir to Holkham,   agreed to give Walpole a lease for life of Beckhall, supposedly for nothing after Walpole got him blind drunk.

Career
Walpole's wife's family were strong Tories and he was anxious to fit in with them by obtaining a seat in Parliament. His brother Robert had a controlling interest at Castle Rising, but  returned himself and Thomas Howard who held the other controlling interest in 1695 and 1698. Walpole was trustee for his brother Robert's son Robert, and when the elder Robert died, Walpole could withhold his consent when his nephew, who now held the controlling interest, was in need of money. Walpole was Freeman of Dunwich in 1701 and on the death of Howard in 1701 was offered an opportunity to stand which he declined. At the 1702 English general election, his nephew stood for King's Lynn and Walpole had the opportunity to stand for Castle Rising. There were local objections to putting up such a strong Tory as uncle Horatio, and local Dissenters had to be reassured that the new Member for Castle Rising  would not be for persecuting them.

Once elected Member of Parliament,  Walpole  took very little interest in Parliament. He became a Freeman of King's Lynn in 1703. He was returned again for Castle Rising at the 1705 English general election in spite of the laments of many Norfolk Whigs about his ineffectiveness. He voted against the Court candidate for speaker, but continued to make little contribution. He was returned again at the  1708 British general election and voted against the impeachment of Dr Sacheverell in 1710. Walpole was becoming an increasing embarrassment to his nephew, who stood at Castle Rising instead of him at the  1710 British general election, but  returned him at a by-election on 11 December 1710. Meanwhile, he was becoming short of money through his wife's extravagance and as a result of being charged rent on Beck Hall. He wrote importuning letters to Harley, claiming to be an effective Tory agent in Norfolk and seeking some preferment. In 1712, he was appointed a commissioner of revenue for Ireland. He voted for the French commerce bill on 18 June 1713 and  presented an address to the Queen  from Norfolk congratulating her on the peace in August1713.  He was finally dropped at the 1713 British general election but retained his post until 1716.

Later life and legacy
In view of the increased rent  for Beckhall, Walpole purchased an estate at Broomthorpe, close to  Holkham, for £2,200 in 1715 with an annuity of £60 for life. He died there without issue on 17 November 1717. He left   Broomthorpe   to his nephew Galfridus Walpole, and other legacies to other members of the family of his brother Colonel Robert including  £1,000 to Robert Walpole and £100 to  Horatio Walpole, who  succeeded him as Member for Castle Rising.

References

1663 births
1717 deaths
18th-century English people
People from Billingford, Breckland
English MPs 1702–1705
English MPs 1705–1707
Members of the Parliament of Great Britain for English constituencies
British MPs 1707–1708
British MPs 1708–1710
British MPs 1710–1713